Ajas is a newly carved tehsil of Bandipora district, in Jammu and Kashmir, India. Ajas is surrounded by Lar tehsil towards East, Wakura tehsil towards West, Bandipora tehsil towards North and Pattan tehsil towards South. Sopore, Bandipore, Baramula and Srinagar are the nearby Cities to Ajas.

Ajas village

Ajas is one of the beautiful villages of Kashmir is situated on the banks of the famous and largest freshwater lake of India, the  Wular Lake. The people of Ajas are known for their broad knowledge and decency. Its circumference is partly bound by huge mountains and dense green forests. A large stream flows through the village and is called the "Baed Koal". 

A total number of 1908 families are residing in the Ajas village and has a population of 12,961 of which 6,726 are males while 6,235 are females as per Population Census 2011.

In Ajas village, the population of children with age 0-6 is 2,160 which makes up 16.67% of the total population of the village. Average Sex Ratio of Ajas village is 927 which is higher than Jammu and Kashmir state average of 889. Child Sex Ratio for the Ajas as per census is 815, lower than Jammu and Kashmir average of 982.

Ajas village has a lower literacy rate compared to Jammu and Kashmir. In 2011, the literacy rate of Ajas village was 56.88% compared to 67.16% of Jammu and Kashmir. In Ajas Male literacy stands at 68.91% while the female literacy rate was 44.24%.

Ajas data

http://www.census2011.co.in/data/village/2777-ajas-jammu-and-kashmir.html

Bandipora district